The Wolf River is a river in Parry Sound District in Central Ontario, Canada. It is in the Great Lakes Basin and is a right tributary of the Pickerel River.

Course
The river begins at Halfpenny Lake in geographic Pringle Township and heads northwest, passes under Ontario Highway 522 near the community of Golden Valley, then continues northwest almost in a straight line through geographic East Mills Township, geographic Hardy Township, and geographic McConkey Township, where it passes over Pine Lake Dam and reaches its mouth at Dollars Lake on the Pickerel River. The Pickerel flows via the French River to Georgian Bay on Lake Huron.

See also  
List of rivers of Ontario

References

Sources

Rivers of Parry Sound District